The Church of Our Lady of Victory is a Roman Catholic parish church in central Lorient, France. It is the most important parish in the Lorient Country.

History
The building was completed in 1955, after the 1943 bombings that destroyed the 1810 Church of Saint Louis. The name of the church (Our Lady of Victory) refers to the 1746 British raid on Lorient.

The church was initially designed in 1953 by Jean-Baptiste Hourlier, who had won the 1926 Grand Prix de Rome and served as the deputy chief architect of the reconstruction of Lorient between 1946 and 1952. The church was labelled an official "20th-century heritage" building.

Architecture
The 54-meter-high concrete bell tower is the highest point of Lorient. Its top is reached by a staircase of 270 steps.

Inside the apse, a fresco made by Nicolas Untersteller shows the Coronation of Mary.

References

Further reading

Roman Catholic churches in France
Churches in Morbihan
Buildings and structures completed in 1955
Lorient
20th-century Roman Catholic church buildings in France